Buddy is a 1997 American family comedy drama film written and directed by Caroline Thompson, produced by Jim Henson Pictures and American Zoetrope, and released by Columbia Pictures on June 6, 1997. It starred Rene Russo as Mrs. Gertrude "Trudy" Lintz and Robbie Coltrane as her husband.

The film was based on the life of a gorilla called Massa with elements of Gertrude Lintz's other gorilla Gargantua (who was called "Buddy" at the time). In real life, Massa became the oldest gorilla on record until 2008, while Buddy/Gargantua died young as a circus attraction and his remains are now on display in a museum.

The gorilla suit used for Buddy was created by Jim Henson's Creature Shop.

Plot
Eccentric millionaire Trudy is an animal lover who is not apologetic about it.

Trudy takes her two newly arrived chimpanzees Joe and Maggie to the movies, causing lots of stares. Returning home to her grand estate, she greets her varied animals: kittens, horses, a cheeky talking green parrot, her prize-winning champion pack of briards, a raccoon, a porcupine, a tortoise and a flock of geese.

Dr. Bill Lindz, Trudy's amiable husband, calls her to the phone. After the call she explains to Dick, their animal handler, he is solely in charge of the animals until the evening, and she drives off to Philadelphia.

There, finding a sickly baby gorilla, Trudy whisks him home, adding to their family. Bill determines that Buddy, as she names him, has severe pneumonia. Life resumes in the Lintz household, while Trudy plies him to take a bottle. The chimpanzees cause a mischievous ruckus in the kitchen, which she ends using a type of rattle that scares them.

Not having luck finding information about gorillas, Trudy travels to see Professor Spatz, who claims knowledge of them from travel to Congo, but can give her no true insight. She marches home, determined to raise Buddy similarly to the chimpanzees, as her own son.

Buddy finds life in the city very difficult to deal with. Trudy discovers that he, unlike the chimpanzees, dislikes baths. He does not like sharing Trudy either. As he grows he gets stronger, making him hard to control. The chimpanzees often get up to mischief, thanks to Maggie's skill at getting the key, unlocking their cages.

A couple come to visit the mansion, the man convincing Trudy to bring the apes to show  in the Chicago World's fair. Bill tries to get her to leave Buddy at home, foreseeing problems. The chimpanzees, now there are a few more, are a great hit. However, naughty Maggie unlocks Buddy's cage. He has a particularly bad experience, as he gets disoriented. The noises, plethora of people and unfamiliar things unsettle him. The fair empties from fear of him.

Buddy has constant flashbacks of the incident, leaving him traumatised and making things even harder for him at home. After he goes on an aggressive rampage, causing a lot of damage to their home, Trudy finally takes Buddy to an ape sanctuary to live among his own kind in peace.

Cast
 Rene Russo as Gertrude "Trudy" Lintz
 Robbie Coltrane as Dr. Bill Lintz
 Alan Cumming as Dick Croner
 Paul Reubens as Professor Spatz

Dane Cook cameos as a cop at the Chicago World's fair. Buddy operated by Peter Elliott (adult Buddy), Lynn Robertson Bruce (juvenile Buddy), Peter Hurst, Mark Sealey (toddler Buddy), Michelan Sisti, Leif Tilden, Star Townsend, Robert Tygner, and Mak Wilson (facial controls). Buddy's vocal effects provided by Hector C. Gika, Gary A. Hecker, and Frank Welker.

Production notes
Rene Russo began rehearsals with the chimpanzees a month before principal photography even started.

The story is loosely based on a real life socialite from the 1920s who raised animals in her mansion to protest inhumane zoo conditions.

Reception
On Rotten Tomatoes, the film has an approval rating of 25% based on reviews from 20 critics.

Roger Ebert of the Chicago Sun-Times gave it 2 out of 4, and wrote: "One of the peculiarities of the film is the vast distance between the movie they've made and the movie they think they've made."
Entertainment Weekly gave it a grade C+.

The film was criticized for its unrealistic animatronics, especially when compared to the real ape performers.

In spite of the film's message, animal rights activists objected to the depiction of chimpanzees as docile pets, happily carrying on wearing human clothes. Among their concerns, was the perpetuation of the idea of chimps as acceptable pets.

References

External links
 
 
 
 

1997 films
1997 comedy-drama films
American biographical films
American children's comedy films
American comedy-drama films
American Zoetrope films
Columbia Pictures films
American docudrama films
1990s English-language films
Fictional gorillas
Films about gorillas
Films about orphans
Films directed by Caroline Thompson
Films scored by Elmer Bernstein
Films set in the 1930s
The Jim Henson Company films
Films with screenplays by Caroline Thompson
1990s American films